The Almaty Light Rail is a light rail line planned to serve  Kazakhstan's largest city Almaty.

Background
Trams in Almaty served the city between 1937 and 2015. It was one of the four tramways of Kazakhstan which continuously operated from their opening dates. The network went into decline starting in the late 20th century, with most of its former routes closed by 2010. Operation of the remaining tram network was halted and indefinitely suspended on 31 October 2015.

Planning
Plans for a light rail network to complement or replace the tram lines have been under discussion by the municipality since 2009.

Route
The  line will contain 36 stations and a depot in the Alatau district. The line will link Almaty’s principal avenues, passing through Momyshuly and Töle Bi Street, Panfilov street to Astana Square, and down Makatayev and Zhetysuskaya streets.

See also
 Almaty Metro
 Trams in Almaty
 Nur-Sultan Light Metro

References

Transport in Almaty
Passenger rail transport in Kazakhstan